Invicta is the third full-length studio album from the American pop punk band Hit the Lights. It was released on January 31, 2012 through Razor & Tie records in North America and 3Wise Records in Australia. The entire album was produced by Mike Sapone who had produced Taking Back Sunday, Brand New. The songs "Gravity", "Earthquake" and "All the Weight" are taken from their previous EP "Invicta EP". In June, the group appeared on the Journeys Backyard BBQ Tour, which included indoor and outdoor performances at malls in the US.

The album debuted at number 129 on the Billboard 200, selling over 4,000 copies in its first week.

Critical reception 
Invicta received mixed to positive reviews from music critics. Jason Lymangrover of AllMusic gave the album 3.5/5 stars, said "the songs are so sonically powerful that they seem, well, epic. As it stands, Invicta is Hit the Lights' ultimate bid for mainstream acceptance and also the quintet's strongest album to date". Andy Ritchie of Rock Sound gave the album a 6/10 rating, said "the album marks the return of one of the most understated but best-loved pop-punk behemoths of the last five years, although it sadly doesn’t quite deliver on its promise".

Track listing

Notes
The song "Faster Now" is co-written with Ryan Key of Yellowcard.
Original version of the three songs from "Invicta EP" were produced by Machine.

Personnel 
Hit The Lights
Nick Thompson – lead vocals
Omar Zehery – lead guitar
Kevin Mahoney – rhythm guitar, backing vocals
David Bermosk – bass, backing vocals
Nate Van Damme – drums, percussion

Production 
Mike Sapone - production, mixing
Paul Leavitt - mastering
Guy Benny - engineer
Claudius Mittendorfer - engineer
Will Putney - engineer
Alberto Declcaza - assistant engineer, mixing assistant

Chart positions

References

External links

Invicta at YouTube (streamed copy where licensed)

2012 albums
Hit the Lights albums
Albums produced by Mike Sapone